Agustín Romualdo Álvarez Rodríguez, O.F.M. Cap. (February 11, 1923 – August 11, 2011) was a Spanish bishop of the Catholic Church.

Agustín Romualdo Álvarez Rodríguez was born in Renedo de Valdetuéjar, Spain, and was ordained a priest on March 12, 1949, from the Order of Friars Minor Capuchin. He was appointed vicar apostolic of the Vicariate Apostolic of Machiques on March 10, 1986, as well as titular bishop of Nasbinca and ordained bishop June 7, 1986. He resigned as vicar apostolic of Machiques October 7, 1995.

See also
Order of Friars Minor Capuchin
Vicariate Apostolic

External links
Catholic Hierarchy
Order of Friars Minor Capuchin

1923 births
2011 deaths
Spanish Roman Catholic titular bishops
Capuchin bishops
Spanish expatriates in Venezuela
Spanish Roman Catholic bishops in South America